The 1999 Nuneaton and Bedworth Borough Council election to the Nuneaton and Bedworth Borough Council were held in May 1999. The Labour Party retained control of the council.

After the election, the composition of the council was:

 Labour 40
 Conservatives 5

Election result

References

1999
1999 English local elections
20th century in Warwickshire